Masters is an extinct town in Weld County, in the U.S. state of Colorado. The GNIS classifies it as a populated place.

History
A post office called Masters was established in 1900, and remained in operation until 1967. The community was named for a local rancher, who owned the land the town was built on.

Masters was located on a rail line from LaSalle to Julesburg, which was built by the Colorado Central Railroad. A siding was built to the north of the post office, near the banks of the South Platte River. The rail line was abandoned by the Union Pacific Railroad in the 1990s.

References

Ghost towns in Colorado
Geography of Weld County, Colorado